Garden Heights may refer to:

Garden Heights, Rocky View County, Alberta, a locality in Rocky View County, Alberta
Garden Heights, Strathcona County, a locality in Strathcona County, Alberta
Garden Heights, a fictional location in The Hate U Give